Bhaikaka University is located in  Karamsad, Anand district, Gujarat, India.

References

Universities in Gujarat
Anand district
Private universities in India
2019 establishments in Gujarat
Educational institutions established in 2019